Pier 35 is a pier in The Embarcadero, San Francisco, USA, just to the east of Pier 39.

Background

It is a major cruise ship terminal, and several cruise operators operate on Pier 35, notably Princess Cruises whose ships Star Princess, Sapphire Princess, and Sea Princess stop at the pier throughout the year. It contains a small lobby with a large archway at the front, where passengers entering from the Embarcadero go through security checks.
On New Year's Eve 2009, a stabbing incident took place on the pier.

The pier was rebuilt by the State Board of Harbor Commissioners and dedicated as the new San Francisco terminal for the Grace Line on October 19, 1933. , one of the line's large new liners, was present and the first of the big new intercoastal liners to use the pier. The rebuilt pier was designed to expedite cargo and passenger passage from ship to destination. Large, comfortable rooms were located on the elevated gallery for passengers and friends for boarding and debarking. The manager for Grace in San Francisco estimated the new facility would handle 12,000 passengers, 60,000 visitors and 300,000 tons of cargo during the next year.

References

External links
 Princess.com
 2012 schedule

Landmarks in San Francisco
Piers in San Francisco
Companies based in San Francisco
Fisherman's Wharf, San Francisco